Randy Miller may refer to:
 Randy Miller (baseball) (born 1953), American baseball pitcher
 Randy Miller (composer), American composer
 Randy Miller (musician) (1971–2010), American musician and drummer